A resource room is a separate, remedial classroom in a school where students with educational disabilities, such as specific learning disabilities, are given direct, specialized instruction and academic remediation and assistance with homework, and related assignments as individuals or in groups.

Overview
Resource rooms are learning spaces where a special education teacher instructs and assists students identified with a disability. These classrooms are staffed by special education teachers and sometimes paraprofessionals. The number of students in a resource room at a specific time varies, but typically consists of at most five students per instructor. Mainstreaming in education typically includes this service to students with special needs.

These students receive special instruction in an individualized or group setting for a portion of the day. Individual needs are supported in resource rooms as defined by the student's Individualized Education Program (IEP). The student getting this type of support will receive some time in the resource room, which is referred to as a "removal from the regular education environment" portion of the day and some time in the regular classroom with modifications and/or accommodations which may include specialized instruction with their non-impaired peers. Special education support within the regular education setting is part of the "inclusion model."

Rationale
Special education instructors in a resource room focus on particular goals as mandated by an IEP and remedial general education curriculum. Some programs emphasize the development of executive skills, including homework completion and behavior.

At least one study has found that resource rooms focusing on homework completion are an effective delivery model to remedial instruction and build academic skills.

Depending on individual needs, students usually attend resource rooms three to five times per week for about forty-five minutes per day. Some research has suggested these classrooms are of particular benefit to students with language-based learning disabilities such as dyslexia. Other research has indicated that students show growth in visuo-motor perception, arithmetic, spelling and overall self-perception through time in the resource room classroom. Students using these services are typically considered included—rather than segregated or mainstreamed—because they attend other classes with their peers, especially at the secondary level. At least one study has suggested students with learning disabilities in resource rooms have higher expectations regarding their academic success when they are in the class. This may be due to the familiarity with the resource room teacher, small group Direct Instruction or confidence within an area they are comfortable in. Researchers believe that explicit instruction that breaks tasks down into smaller segments is an important tool for learning for students with learning disabilities. Students often benefit from "reteaching" of core concepts taught initially in general education classroom and reinforced in resource rooms via the small-group instructional model, which has been shown to lead to achievement in students with a multitude of educational disabilities.

See also
Special school
Mainstreaming in education
Inclusion (education)
Special education
Individualized Education Plan
Learning disability
Direct instruction

References

External links 
 Quay, Herbert C., John P. Glavin, Frederick R. Annesley, and John S. Werry. 1972. “The Modification of Problem Behavior and Academic Achievement in a Resource Room.” Journal of School Psychology 10, no. 2 (January): 187–98. doi:10.1016/0022-4405(72)90049-0.
 specialed.about.com
eric.ed.gov

Special education
Educational facilities